Briony Stewart is an Australian writer and illustrator of children's books.

Career 
Stewart's first book Kumiko and the Dragon  was published by University of Queensland Press after winning the inaugural Voices on the Coast Youth Literature Festival writing award. Inspired by Stewart's Japanese grandmother, Kumiko and the Dragon won the Aurealis Award for Best Children's Short Fiction, and was listed as a Notable book by the Children's Book Council of Australia in 2008. Two sequels, Kumiko and the Dragon's Secret (released in 2010) and Kumiko and the Shadow Catchers (released in 2011) completed the series as a trilogy. Both books continues Kumiko's fantasy adventure, with similar references to folktale and Japanese mythology.
In 2012 Stewart's book Kumiko and the Shadow Catchers won in the Queensland Literary Awards Children's Book category.

Stewart's first picture book, The Red Wheelbarrow was published by University of Queensland Press in 2012. A wordless picture book inspired by the famous poem by William Carlos Williams, celebrating the beauty in small everyday moments. The book was shortlisted in the Australian Speech Pathology, Book of the Year Awards, was a CBCA notable book, and in 2015 was selected by the International Board of Books for Young People (IBBY) to be part of its international silent books project, a travelling exhibition which was launched in June 2015 in Rome at the Palazzo delle Esposizioni.

Stewart published a second picture book in 2014 entitled Here in the Garden, a gentle book about loss and grief and acceptance as experienced by a child. Since the birth of her children in 2015 and 2017, Stewart has collaborated as illustrator on a number of different titles including a series of three picture books written by Australian Comedian Jimmy Rees. 

As a solo creator, Stewart wrote and illustrated two picture books about a cheeky dog named Magoo, the first of which, We Love You Magoo won the 2021 Honour Book prize from the Children’s Book Council of Australia. 

Briony Stewart also made Accidentally Kelly Street a picture book adaptation of the 1993 song ‘Accidently Kelly Street’ by Melbourne music group Frente! The book uses the lyrics of the song as written by the group’s bassist, Tim O’Connor. The book has been praised by lead singer Angie Heart, as well as Myf Warhurst and Zan Rowe.

In 2022 Briony Stewart and author Sherryl Clark jointly won the Prime Ministers Literary Award children’s literature category, for their junior fiction verse-novel Mina and the Whole Wide World.

Bibliography

As author and illustrator 
Kumiko and the Dragon (UQP, 2007) - CBCA Notable book, Aurealis Award winner for Children's short fiction 
Kumiko and the Dragon's Secret (UQP, 2010)
Kumiko and the Shadow Catchers (UQP, 2011) CBCA Notable book, Queensland Literary Award winner for Children's books.
The Red Wheelbarrow (UQP, 2012) - CBCA Notable Book
Here in the Garden (UQP, 2014)
We Love You Magoo (Puffin, 2020) - Honour Book Award for the Children's Book of the Year Award: Early Childhood in 2021
Where Are You Magoo (Puffin, 2021)

As illustrator 
The Lion in Our Living Room (Affirm Press, 2017) 
The Bear in Our Backyard (Affirm Press, 2018)
Nullabaoo Hullaballoo (Puffin - Penguin Random House, 2019) 
Trouble in the Surf (National Library of Australia Publishing, 2019) - CBCA Notable Book 
Bedtime Sorted (Affirm Press, 2021)
Mina and the Whole Wide World (UQP, 2021)- CBCA Notable Book, Prime Minister's Literary Award winner 
Dinner Sorted (Affirm Press, 2022)
Accidentally Kelly Street (Affirm Press, 2022)
Holiday Sorted (Affirm Press, 2023)
The Garden At the End of the World (UQP, 2023)

References

Australian children's writers
Living people
1984 births